Anna Hutchison (born 8 February 1986) is a New Zealand actress and producer. Her roles include Delphi Greenlaw on Shortland Street (2002–04); Lily Chilman, the Yellow Cheetah Ranger on Power Rangers Jungle Fury (2008); Allison Dine on Underbelly: A Tale of Two Cities (2009); Amy Smart on Go Girls (2009–12); Jules Louden in The Cabin in the Woods (2012); Laeta on Spartacus: War of the Damned (2013); Sasha on Anger Management (2013–14) and Kim in The Right Girl (2015).

Career
Hutchison's career began on the New Zealand soap opera Shortland Street and continued in the American series Power Rangers Jungle Fury. She also played Allison Dine, the girlfriend of crime figure Terry Clark in the Australian television series Underbelly: A Tale of Two Cities also known as Underbelly: The Mr Asia Story, and Amy Smart in the New Zealand television comedy-drama series Go Girls. In 2012, she starred in the Joss Whedon-Drew Goddard meta-fictional slasher film The Cabin in the Woods.

On 13 April 2012, it was announced that Hutchison would be joining the cast of Spartacus for the third season in 2013, in a main role as Laeta, a Roman taken prisoner by Spartacus.

Filmography

Awards

References

External links
 

1986 births
Living people
New Zealand television actresses
21st-century New Zealand actresses
New Zealand expatriate actresses in the United States
New Zealand film actresses
People from Auckland
New Zealand soap opera actresses